Since 2006, the England women's national volleyball team plays as part of the Great Britain women's national volleyball team.

External links
 Official website

National women's volleyball teams
Volleyball
Volleyball in England
Women's volleyball in England